Kaushik Naginda Amalean (born 7 April 1965, in Colombo) is a former Sri Lankan cricketer who played in 2 Tests and 8 ODIs from 1986 to 1988.

External links
 Kaushik Amalean at Cricinfo
 Kaushik Amalean at CricketArchive

1965 births
Living people
Sri Lanka One Day International cricketers
Sri Lanka Test cricketers
Sri Lankan cricketers
Alumni of S. Thomas' College, Mount Lavinia